Suor Angelica (Sister Angelica) is an opera in one act by Giacomo Puccini to an original Italian libretto by Giovacchino Forzano. It is the second opera of the trio of operas known as Il trittico (The Triptych). It received its world premiere at the Metropolitan Opera on December 14, 1918.

Roles

Synopsis

Place: A convent in Italy
Time: The latter part of the 17th century

The opera opens with scenes showing typical aspects of life in the convent – all the sisters sing hymns, the Monitor scolds two lay-sisters, everyone gathers for recreation in the courtyard. The sisters rejoice because, as the mistress of novices explains, this is the first of three evenings that occur each year when the setting sun strikes the fountain so as to turn its water golden. This event causes the sisters to remember Bianca Rosa, a sister who has died. Sister Genevieve suggests they pour some of the "golden" water onto her tomb.

The nuns discuss their desires. While the Monitor believes that any desire at all is wrong, Sister Genevieve confesses that she wishes to see lambs again because she used to be a shepherdess when she was a girl, and Sister Dolcina wishes for something good to eat. Sister Angelica claims to have no desires, but as soon as she says so, the nuns begin gossiping – Sister Angelica has lied, because her true desire is to hear from her wealthy noble family, whom she has not heard from in seven years. Rumors are that she was sent to the convent in punishment.

The conversation is interrupted by the Infirmary Sister, who begs Sister Angelica to make a herbal remedy, her specialty. Two tourières arrive, bringing supplies to the convent, and news that a grand coach is waiting outside. Sister Angelica becomes nervous and upset, thinking rightly that someone in her family has come to visit her. The Abbess chastises Sister Angelica for her inappropriate excitement and announces the visitor, the Princess, Sister Angelica's aunt.

The Princess explains that Angelica's sister is to be married and that Angelica must sign a document renouncing her claim to her inheritance. Angelica replies that she has repented of her sin, but she cannot offer up everything in sacrifice to the Virgin – she cannot forget the memory of her illegitimate son, who was taken from her seven years ago. The Princess at first refuses to speak, but finally informs Sister Angelica that her son died of fever two years ago. Sister Angelica, devastated, signs the document and collapses in tears. The Princess leaves.

Sister Angelica is seized by a heavenly vision – she believes she hears her son calling for her to meet him in paradise. She makes a poison and drinks it, but realizes that in committing suicide, she has committed a mortal sin and has damned herself to eternal separation from her son. She begs the Virgin Mary for mercy and, as she dies, she sees a miracle: the Virgin Mary appears, along with Sister Angelica's son, who runs to embrace her.

Recordings

Noted arias
"Senza mamma" – Suor Angelica
"Nel silenzio" – The Princess

References

Further reading
Holden, Amanda (ed.), The New Penguin Opera Guide, New York: Penguin Putnam, 2001. 
Warrack, John and West, Ewan, The Oxford Dictionary of Opera New York: Oxford University Press: 1992

External links
 
 Libretto
 , Ermonela Jaho, Royal Opera House (2011)

Operas by Giacomo Puccini
One-act operas
Italian-language operas
Verismo operas
Opera world premieres at the Metropolitan Opera
1918 operas
Operas
Operas set in Italy